The Sabra ("prickly pear") is an extensively upgraded M60 Patton tank developed by Israel Military Industries.  Mk II version of this upgrade package was used in one of  Turkish Army's modernization programs. The Sabra is known as the M60T in Turkish service.

Overview
The Sabra was initially developed as a further evolution of the Magach 7C. The ballistic profile of the appliqué armor was improved and it incorporated the MG253 120 mm gun developed by IMI.  The upgrade package was first offered to Turkey as an option for its tank modernization program and later offered for general export.  The Turkish government selected the Sabra Mk II (a further modified version of the Sabra) for its upgrade program, which was intended as a stopgap measure. A contract estimated to be worth $688 million USD was signed on March 29, 2002.  The first Sabra Mk II was delivered for Turkish trials in 2005 and passed qualifications in May, 2006. 170 were upgraded between 2007 and April, 2009. The upgrades were undertaken by the Turkish Army's 2nd Main Maintenance Center Command, with upgrade kits supplied by IMI.

Variants
Sabra Mk I
The Mk I was essentially an upgraded Magach 7C.  It incorporated a new 120 mm gun developed by IMI, improved applique armor, and the Knight fire control system from Elbit Systems. The running gear would also be upgraded from the Magach to improve cross-country mobility. The hybrid electric and hydraulic turret traverse system from the Magach 7C is replaced with an all-electric system.

Sabra Mk II / M60T
Unlike the Mk I which used a low-profile commander's cupola, the Mk II retained the larger M60 Patton style M19 cupola with the M85 12.7 mm machine gun found on the M60s in Turkish service.  This version would also include a Commander's Independent Thermal Viewer (CITV).  The Mk II also uses a more powerful MTU Friedrichshafen engine built under license in Turkey (MTU Turk A.S.), and a Renk transmission with four forward and two reverse gears.  The Mk II is also equipped with explosive reactive armor. The tanks were upgraded by the Turkish military's 2nd Main Maintenance Center with Israeli cooperation. All the systems except the armor package were built under license with technology transfer in Turkey. Sabra can carry 500 litres of diesel fuel.

Sabra Mk III
The Sabra Mk III incorporates armor technology, cannon, the RWR/IR warning system, and tracks from the Merkava Mk IV.

Users
  Turkey – 450 as M60 Sabra, Currently 169 in service as of 2022

See also

 Magach, served as the starting point for the Sabra design.
 M60-2000, an alternative upgrade option from General Dynamics Land Systems which was also offered to Turkey.

References

External links

 IMI Systems Upgraded M-60
 Federation of American Scientists

Main battle tanks of Turkey
Main battle tanks of Israel
Sabra
Military vehicles introduced in the 2000s
Tanks of Turkey
Israel–United States military relations